This is a list of schools in the city of Nottingham, in the English county of Nottinghamshire.

State-funded schools 
Source: Nottingham City Council

Primary schools 

 Ambleside Primary School
 Bentinck Primary School
 Berridge Primary School
 Blessed Robert Widmerpool RC Primary School
 Blue Bell Hill Primary School
 Bluecoat Primary Academy 
 Brocklewood Primary School
 Bulwell St Mary's Primary School 
 Burford Primary School
 Cantrell Primary School
 Carrington Primary School
 Claremont Primary School
 Crabtree Farm Primary School
 Djanogly Northgate Academy
 Djanogly Sherwood Academy
 Djanogly Strelley Academy
 Dovecote Primary School
 Dunkirk Primary School 
 Edale Rise Primary School
 Edna G Olds Academy
 Firbeck Primary School
 Fernwood Primary School
 Firbeck Academy
 Forest Fields Primary School
 Glade Hill Primary School
 The Glapton Academy
 Glenbrook Primary School
 Greenfields Community School
 Haydn Primary School
 Heathfield Primary School
 Hempshill Hall Primary School
 Henry Whipple Primary School
 Highbank Primary School
 Hogarth Academy
 Huntingdon Academy
 Jubilee LEAD Academy
 Melbury Primary School
 Mellers Primary School 
 Middleton Primary School
 The Milford Academy
 Nottingham Academy
 Northgate Primary School
 Old Basford School
 Our Lady & St Edward RC Primary Academy
 Our Lady of Perpetual Succour RC Primary School
 Portland Spencer Academy
 Radford Primary School Academy
 Rise Park Primary School
 Robert Shaw Primary School
 Robin Hood Primary School
 Rosslyn Park Primary School
 Rufford Primary School
 St Ann's Well Academy
 St Augustine's RC Primary School
 St Margaret Clitherow RC Primary School
 St Mary's RC Primary School
 St Patrick's RC Primary School
 St Teresa's RC Primary School
 Scotholme Primary School
 Seely Primary School
 Snape Wood Primary School
 Sneinton St Stephen's CE Primary School 
 South Wilford Endowed CE Primary School
 Southglade Primary School
 Southwark Primary School
 Southwold Primary School
 Springfield Academy
 Stanstead Primary School
 Sycamore Academy
 Victoria Primary School
 Walter Halls Primary School
 Warren Primary Academy
 Welbeck Primary School
 Westglade Primary School
 Whitegate Primary School
 Whitemoor Academy
 William Booth Primary School
 Windmill LEAD Academy

Secondary schools 

 Bluecoat Aspley Academy
 Bluecoat Beechdale Academy
 Bluecoat Trent Academy
 Bluecoat Wollaton Academy
 The Bulwell Academy
 Djanogly City Academy
 Ellis Guilford School
 Farnborough Spencer Academy
 Fernwood School
 Nottingham Academy
 The Nottingham Emmanuel School
 Nottingham Free School
 Nottingham Girls' Academy
 Nottingham University Academy of Science and Technology
 Nottingham University Samworth Academy
 The Oakwood Academy
 Park Vale Academy
 Trinity Catholic School
 The Wells Academy

Special and alternative schools 

 CP Riverside School
 Denewood Academy
 Hospital and Home Education PRU
 Nethergate Academy
 Oak Field School
 Rosehill School
 Stone Soup Academy
 Unity Academy
 Westbury Academy
 Woodlands Academy

Further education
 Bilborough College
Nottingham College
 Confetti Institute of Creative Technologies

Independent schools

Primary and preparatory schools
 Fig Tree Primary School
 Green Crescent Primary School
 Iona School
 St Joseph's School

Senior and all-through schools
 Hollygirt School
 Jamia Al-Hudaa
 Nottingham Girls' High School
 Nottingham High School

Special and alternative schools 
 FUEL
 Sutherland House School
 Take 1 Learning Centre

References

Nottingham
Schools in Nottingham
Schools